Ban Niam station is a railway station located in Khayung Subdistrict, Uthumphon Phisai District, Sisaket Province.

References 

Railway stations in Thailand
Sisaket province